Wolverhampton Borough Police was a police service in the Borough of Wolverhampton from 1837–1966, when it was merged into the West Midlands Constabulary.

The town's commissioners approved the formation of the police force on 3 August 1837. The original Superintendent was Richard Castle, who was appointed with the assistance of the Metropolitan Police, with a salary of five shillings and six pence per day. The force originally consisted of one sergeant and five police constables and was based in the old Town Hall, Garrick Street.

By the early 1900s officer numbers had increased to 109 men. The first female officers were employed in 1937 and were immediately attached to the Criminal Investigation Department. Numbers were increased once more following World War II, with 215 men and 8 women being in post to meet the increased demand for policing.

The force continued to grow in size, with more than 300 police officers employed by the 1960s. Following a Royal Commission on the police in 1960, it was merged with Dudley Borough Police  and Walsall Borough Police, and parts of the Staffordshire Constabulary and Worcestershire Constabulary, to become the West Midlands Constabulary from 1 April 1966. Since a further merger in 1974, Wolverhampton has been served by the West Midlands Police.

Chief Constables
1837–1842 - Richard Castle
1848–1857 - Lt. Col. Gilbert Hogg
1857–1878 - Capt. Henry Sergrave
1878–1891 - Major Robert David Dewar Hay
1891–1916 - Capt. Lindsay Robert Burnett
1916–1929 - David Webster
1930–1943 - Edwin Tilley
1944–1966 - Norman W. Goodchild

References

Defunct police forces of England
History of Wolverhampton
1837 establishments in England
1966 disestablishments in England
Antecedents of the West Midlands Police